Brian L. Friedman (born May 28, 1977) is an American dancer and choreographer.

Friedman has created the choreography for many popular music artists – such as Britney Spears, Cher,  Beyoncé Knowles, and Mariah Carey – as well as for music videos, concert tours, and television and film productions.

Early life
Friedman was born in Highland Park, Illinois, United States. He is Jewish.

Friedman began dancing at the age of 11 in his hometown of Scottsdale, Arizona, and appeared in various dance shows including Newsies, and Kids Incorporated. By the age of 16, he was responsible for his own dance studio.

Friedman trained under Joe Tremaine, Kenny Ortega, Vince Patterson, and Twyla Tharp. As a young dancer, Friedman worked with such artists as Michael Jackson, Paula Abdul, Celine Dion, Melissa Etheridge, Salt N Pepa, and Patti LaBelle.

He has been credited for providing choreography for films such as Charlie's Angels and Charlie's Angels: Full Throttle, among others.

Friedman also appeared in a singing group, "Blessed With Soul", along with Brittany Murphy, but left to pursue a career in dance.

Friedman also co-owned a dance studio with his mother, Judi Friedman, called The Dance Source. It closed in 2000, so he could focus full-time on choreography.

Career

Choreography
Friedman has choreographed, directed, and performed many music videos and performances, such as Aphex Twin "Windowlicker", Britney Spears "Toxic", "Me Against the Music", "Boys", "I'm a Slave 4 U", and her "The Dream Within a Dream Tour" and Onyx Hotel Tour Tours. His other work includes "My Love Is Like...Wo" by Mýa, "The One" by Prince, and *NSYNC's "Pop".

Friedman has also choreographed for various television shows including Will & Grace, The Tonight Show with Jay Leno, Late Show with David Letterman, and the Billboard Music Awards.

From 2004 to 2016, Friedman served as the creative director of The PULSE on Tour, where he toured around the world mentoring students.

In 2011, Friedman re-joined Britney Spears to choreograph the music videos, and performances for her #1 Singles "Hold It Against Me"and "Till The World Ends".

In 2019, he was responsible for choreographing all musical numbers in Melanie Martinez' first movie, K-12.

His most recent work is with Itzy, a rising girl group based in South Korea, for their new comeback single, “Icy”.

Television
Friedman appeared as a judge and choreographer on the show So You Think You Can Dance?. After two seasons, Friedman was offered a contract by Simon Cowell to appear on his show, Grease Is the Word alongside Sinitta, David Ian, and David Gest. The show lasted only one series. In 2007, Friedman became a judge and the replacement for Louis Walsh on the UK series of The X Factor alongside Cowell, Sharon Osbourne, and fellow new judge Dannii Minogue, as part of a revamp to the show in series 4. On June 22, after completing auditions in London, it was announced that Friedman had stepped down as a judge and would be replaced by Walsh. Subsequently, Cowell created a brand new on-camera position for Friedman as creative director. As creative director, he was able to work with the contestants of the show as well as the judges, Osbourne, Cowell, Minogue, Walsh, and later Cheryl Cole, who replaced Osbourne.

Friedman left the UK show in 2010, and was re-contracted to work on the American version of the show, The X Factor USA, alongside the contestants and judges; Simon Cowell, Nicole Scherzinger, L.A. Reid, Paula Abdul, and formerly Cheryl Cole.

Friedman finished his judging duties on MTV's Top Pop Group and directed, choreographed, and danced on Dancing with the Stars, before acting as producer and creative director for America's Got Talent, and as creative director for The X Factor USA.

In 2012, Friedman returned to work on The X Factor UK for the ninth series alongside the judges Gary Barlow, Tulisa Contostavlos, Nicole Scherzinger, and Louis Walsh for the first three weeks of the live shows. After this, Friedman flew back to Los Angeles to work with the acts permanently on the live shows of the second season of the American version alongside Simon Cowell, L.A. Reid, and new judges Demi Lovato and Britney Spears. He left the show after the second season, and Jamie King took his position in the third season. He appeared in one episode of Welling Films' dance series Avengers of eXtreme Illusions.

Friedman also choreographed the stage performance for Irish pop duo Jedward for the Eurovision Song Contest 2011 semi-final. In 2014, Friedman returned to The X Factor UK as creative director.

Friedman took part in the 2015 series of I'm a Celebrity...Get Me Out of Here!. He finished in 11th place.

He resides in Los Angeles and London, with his husband Daniel Brown.

Personal life
In an early 2015 interview with Attitude magazine for its Love & Marriage commemorative special issue, Friedman and his partner, Daniel Brown announced plans for their upcoming wedding.

Friedman married his partner in February 2020.

Friedman is a patron of the Urdang Academy.

Awards
Friedman has been nominated for 4 MTV Video Music Awards, 2 Music Video Production Awards, and 5 American Choreography Awards.

References

External links
 
 

1977 births
American choreographers
20th-century American Jews
American LGBT entertainers
LGBT Jews
LGBT people from Illinois
LGBT people from Arizona
LGBT dancers
LGBT choreographers
Living people
People from Highland Park, Illinois
So You Think You Can Dance choreographers
I'm a Celebrity...Get Me Out of Here! (British TV series) participants
21st-century American Jews
21st-century LGBT people